Note: There is also a "Sweyn Holm" off St Ninian's Isle, Shetland

Sweyn Holm is a small island in the Orkney Islands, next to Gairsay.

It is thought to be named for Sweyn Asleifsson (Sveinn), who was connected with Gairsay or possibly a corruption of "servant's island" in Norse.

Geography and geology
Sweyn Holm is made up of red sandstone.

References

Uninhabited islands of Orkney